Gettin' Out the Good Stuff is the second studio album by American country music artist David Lee Murphy. The tracks "Every Time I Get Around You" and "The Road You Leave Behind" were both Top 5 hits on the U.S. Billboard Hot Country Singles & Tracks charts in 1996. "Genuine Rednecks" and "Breakfast in Birmingham" were released as well, although neither reached Top 40 on the country charts.

Track listing
All tracks written or co-written by David Lee Murphy. Co-writers are named in parentheses.
"Every Time I Get Around You" – 3:25
"The Road You Leave Behind" – 3:53
"She's Really Something to See" – 3:57
"Genuine Rednecks" – 4:14
"100 Years Too Late" (Dobie Gray) – 4:10
"Born That Way" (Jimbeau Hinson) – 3:06
"Breakfast in Birmingham" (Kim Tribble) – 3:35
"Gettin' Out the Good Stuff" – 3:41
"I've Been a Rebel (And It Don't Pay)" – 4:35
"Pirate's Cove" – 4:28

Personnel
Mike Brignardello – bass guitar
Chad Cromwell – drums
Stuart Duncan – fiddle on "She's Really Something to See" and "Genuine Rednecks"
Paul Franklin – steel guitar
David Hargis – electric guitar on "Gettin' out the Good Stuff"
Jimbeau Hinson – background vocals on "Born That Way"
Brent Mason – acoustic guitar, electric guitar
David Lee Murphy – lead vocals, background vocals, acoustic guitar
Steve Nathan – keyboards
Mickey Raphael – harmonica on "100 Years Too Late" and "Pirates Cove"
Harry Stinson – background vocals on "Genuine Rednecks", "100 Years Too Late" and "Breakfast in Birmingham"
Biff Watson – acoustic guitar

Chart performance

References
[ Gettin' Out the Good Stuff] at Allmusic

1996 albums
MCA Records albums
David Lee Murphy albums
Albums produced by Tony Brown (record producer)